The 2013 ARFU Women's Sevens Series is the 14th edition of Asia's continental sevens tournament for women. It was played over two legs hosted in Pattaya, Thailand and in Pune, India. Japan were declared 2013 Asian Champions.

Tournaments

Thailand

Pool stages
20–21 September 2013 at IPE Stadium, Baeng Sen, Thailand.

Group A

China 44-0 Laos
Philippines 32-5 Laos
Philippines 0-32 China

Group B

Japan 27-0 South Korea
Chinese Taipei 17-5 South Korea
Japan 41-0 Chinese Taipei

Group C

Kazakhstan 40-0 Guam
Singapore 15-12 Guam
Kazakhstan 42-0 Singapore

Group D

Hong Kong 25-5 Sri Lanka
Thailand 0-5 Sri Lanka
Hong Kong 10-10 Thailand

Knockout stages
Bowl

Plate

Cup

India
9–10 November 2013 at Pune, India

Pool stages

Group A

China 43-0 India
Kazakhstan 22-7 Thailand
Sri Lanka 36-0 India
China 31-7 Thailand
Kazakhstan 25-0 Sri Lanka
China 29-10 Sri Lanka
India 0-44 Kazakhstan
Thailand 5-0 Sri Lanka
China 19-10 Kazakhstan
Thailand 29-0 India

Group B

Japan 53-7 Iran
Hong Kong 57-0 Philippines
Singapore 5-20 United Arab Emirates
Japan 43-0 Philippines
Singapore 29-7 Iran
Hong Kong 34-5 United Arab Emirates
Japan 33-5 Singapore
United Arab Emirates 31-7 Philippines
Hong Kong 45-14 Iran
Philippines 7-10 Iran
Japan 28-5 United Arab Emirates 
Hong Kong 15-7 Singapore
United Arab Emirates 17-0 Iran
Singapore 15-0 Philippines
Japan 21-17 Hong Kong

Knockout stages

9th/10th 
Iran 20-15 (AET) India

7th/8th 
Sri Lanka 12-19 Singapore

5th/6th 
Thailand 33-19 UAE

3rd/4th
Kazakhstan 30-12 Hong Kong

Final
China 14-19 Japan

References 

2013
2013 rugby sevens competitions
2013 in Asian rugby union
2013 in women's rugby union